Michel Charland (born 1 February 1945) is a Canadian athlete. He competed in the men's long jump at the 1968 Summer Olympics.

References

1945 births
Living people
Athletes (track and field) at the 1968 Summer Olympics
Canadian male long jumpers
Olympic track and field athletes of Canada
Athletes (track and field) at the 1967 Pan American Games
Pan American Games track and field athletes for Canada
Athletes from Montreal